Nobles County is a county in the U.S. state of Minnesota. As of the 2020 census, the population was 22,290. Its county seat is Worthington. Nobles County comprises the Worthington, MN Micropolitan Statistical Area.

History

Nobles County was first occupied by the Sisseton Sioux. The first white man to set foot on the land was Joseph Nicollet who came to map out the area in 1842. Nicollet named Lake Okabena (there were two Lake Okabenas at the time), Lake Ocheda, East and West Graham Lake and the Kanaranzi Creek.

The first settlement was near Graham Lakes in 1846. Nobles County was established May 23, 1857, and organized October 27, 1870. The county was named for William H. Nobles, a member of the Minnesota territorial legislature in 1854 and 1856. In Autumn 1856 he began the construction of a wagon road for the US government, crossing southwestern Minnesota and Nobles County, to extend from Fort Ridgely to South Pass in the Rocky Mountains. This work was continued in 1857 but was not completed. Nobles County was created by the Minnesota Territory legislature just before the full force of the Panic of 1857 was felt. Settlers were further discouraged from coming by the Spirit Lake Massacre of 1857, where a band of Sioux murdered settlers in Spirit Lake and along the Des Moines River in Jackson and Cottonwood Counties. The few whites in the area were understandably reluctant to stay.

During the summer of 1867, a mail route was established from Blue Earth through the Graham Lakes settlement to Yankton, South Dakota. In January, a Post Office was established in each settlement. The population in the spring of 1870 was 117 and nearly doubled by fall. County Government did not start until 1870. The first railroad, the St. Paul & Sioux City Railway, was built in 1871. This later became the Chicago Northwestern Railroad, and is now operated by the Union Pacific Railroad.

In 1871, a group of men from Toledo, Ohio organized a company to locate a colony of settlers in some western county. After traveling 20,000 miles in the Midwest, they decided on Nobles County and by the spring of 1872, hundreds of people came in and took up land. Worthington was platted in 1871, and became the county seat in 1873. The Worthington & Sioux Falls Railway was established in 1876. This led to rapid settlement in Rushmore, Adrian, and the western portions of the county.

The 1860 census of Nobles County showed 11 families, 35 persons, (3 from Norway, 3 from Bavaria, 1 from Ireland and the rest from the eastern states). In 1880, the population was 4,435. In 1895, the population was 11,905, and in 1970, the population was up to 23,208. In 2000, the population was 20,832, and the 2010 census showed a population of 21,378.

COVID-19 pandemic (2020)
In May 2020, Nobles County had the fourth-highest per capita COVID-19 infection rate of any county in the United States. About one of every 17 residents had tested positive, with 1,319 cases.

By April 1, 2022, the county had 6,936 cases and 60 deaths.

Economy
This county has farming and meat packing.

Geography

Nobles County is on the southern side of Minnesota. Its southern border abuts the northern border of the state of Iowa.

Major highways

  Interstate 90
  U.S. Highway 59
  Minnesota State Highway 60
  Minnesota State Highway 91
  Minnesota State Highway 264

Adjacent counties

 Murray County - north
 Cottonwood County - northeast
 Jackson County - east
 Osceola County, Iowa - southeast
 Lyon County, Iowa - southwest
 Rock County - west

Lakes

 East Graham Lake
 Fulda First Lake
 Indian Lake
 Iowa Lake (part)
 Jack Lake
 Kinbrae Lake
 Lake Bella
 Lake Ocheda
 Lake Okabena
 West Graham Lake
 Willow Lake (part)

Protected areas

 Adrian Spring County Park
 Aid Pit State Wildlife Management Area
 Bigelow State Wildlife Management Area
 Champepadan State Wildlife Management Area
 Compass Prairie Scientific and Natural Area
 Dewald State Wildlife Management Area
 Eagle Lake State Wildlife Management Area
 Ells Pit State Wildlife Management Area
 Fenmont State Wildlife Management Area
 Fulda State Wildlife Management Area
 Fury State Wildlife Management Area
 Groth State Wildlife Management Area
 Hawkeye County Park
 John Erickson State Wildlife Management Area
 Lake Bella State Wildlife Management Area
 Lake Ocheda Game Refuge
 Lone Tree State Wildlife Management Area
 Maka-Oicu County Park
 Midway County Park
 Peterson State Wildlife Management Area
 Pheasant Run State Wildlife Management Area
 Scheuring State Wildlife Management Area
 Schweigert State Wildlife Management Area
 Sherwood State Wildlife Management Area
 Sportsman County Park
 Swessinger State Wildlife Management Area
 West Graham State Wildlife Management Area

Geology
Nobles County sits atop the Buffalo Ridge, a large expanse of rolling hills in southwestern Minnesota reaching a height of 1,995' (608m) ASL. The Buffalo Ridge marks the most southerly extent of the last glaciation, and extends 60 miles (96 km) through Lincoln, Lyon, Pipestone, Murray, Rock, and Nobles counties. It is a drainage divide separating the watersheds of the Mississippi and Missouri Rivers. Because of its elevation and constant winds, Buffalo Ridge has become a major site for wind energy. Over 200 wind turbines stand along the Ridge.

Buffalo Ridge is part of the inner coteau and is the highest point of the Coteau des Prairies in Minnesota. Its bedrock is formed of Cretaceous shale, sandstone and clay that lie above the pinkish-red Upper Precambrian Sioux Quartzite. These units are covered in most areas by thick deposits of glacial drift, which consist of up to 800' (244m) of pre-Wisconsin age glacial till left after the glaciers receded. The inner coteau is made up of extremely stream-eroded glacial deposits of pre-Wisconsin glacial drift, which is then covered by a 6-15' (1.8-4.6m) thick deposit of a wind-blown silt called loess. This covering results in the creation of an area with long, gently sloping hills. Loess is an easily eroded material, resulting in few lakes and wetlands in the inner coteau area. Loess however promotes well-established dendritic drainage networks flowing into the Missouri River and Minnesota River systems.

Demographics

2020 census

Note: the US Census treats Hispanic/Latino as an ethnic category. This table excludes Latinos from the racial categories and assigns them to a separate category. Hispanics/Latinos can be of any race.

2000 census
As of the 2000 census, there were 20,832 people, 7,939 households, and 5,517 families in the county. The population density was 29.1/sqmi (11.2/km2). There were 8,465 housing units at an average density of 11.8/sqmi (4.57/km2). The racial makeup of the county was 86.50% White, 1.07% Black or African American, 0.31% Native American, 3.98% Asian, 0.07% Pacific Islander, 6.64% from other races, and 1.43% from two or more races. 11.16% of the population were Hispanic or Latino of any race. 47.0% were of German, 8.3% Dutch and 8.0% Norwegian ancestry.

There were 7,939 households, out of which 32.10% had children under the age of 18 living with them, 58.80% were married couples living together, 6.90% had a female householder with no husband present, and 30.50% were non-families. 26.50% of all households were made up of individuals, and 14.10% had someone living alone who was 65 years of age or older. The average household size was 2.58 and the average family size was 3.11.

The county population contained with 26.50% under the age of 18, 8.20% from 18 to 24, 26.60% from 25 to 44, 21.30% from 45 to 64, and 17.40% who were 65 years of age or older. The median age was 38 years. For every 100 females there were 99.50 males. For every 100 females age 18 and over, there were 98.40 males.

The median income for a household in the county was $35,684, and the median income for a family was $43,076. Males had a median income of $27,853 versus $20,346 for females. The per capita income for the county was $16,987. About 8.20% of families and 11.70% of the population were below the poverty line, including 15.30% of those under age 18 and 12.50% of those age 65 or over.

Communities

Cities

 Adrian
 Bigelow
 Brewster (named Hersey until August 1880)
 Dundee
 Ellsworth
 Kinbrae (named Airlie, then DeForest until August 1883)
 Lismore
 Round Lake
 Rushmore
 Wilmont
 Worthington (county seat. Site named Okabena until Autumn 1871)

Census-designated place
 Leota

Unincorporated communities

 Org (named Sioux Falls Junction until 1890)
 Pfingsten
 Ransom
 Reading
 St. Kilian

Townships

 Bigelow Township
 Bloom Township
 Dewald Township
 Elk Township
 Graham Lakes Township
 Grand Prairie Township
 Hersey Township
 Indian Lake Township
 Larkin Township
 Leota Township
 Lismore Township
 Little Rock Township
 Lorain Township
 Olney Township
 Ransom Township
 Seward Township
 Summit Lake Township
 Westside Township
 Wilmont Township
 Worthington Township

Politics
Nobles County voters have tended to vote Republican in the past several decades. In 67% of national elections since 1980, the county has selected the Republican Party candidate (as of 2020).

See also
 National Register of Historic Places listings in Nobles County, Minnesota

References

External links
 Nobles County website
 Rose's History of Nobles County
 noblescountyhistory.org

 
Minnesota counties
1870 establishments in Minnesota
Populated places established in 1870